Řečice may refer to places in the Czech Republic:

Řečice (Pelhřimov District), a municipality and village in the Vysočina Region
Řečice (Žďár nad Sázavou District), a municipality and village in the Vysočina Region
Řečice, a village and part of Blatná in the South Bohemian Region
Řečice, a village and part of Volfířov in the South Bohemian Region
Řečice, a village and part of Zábřezí-Řečice in the Hradec Králové Region
Červená Řečice, a municipality and village in the Vysočina Region
Kardašova Řečice, a municipality and village in the South Bohemian Region